Cold Summer is the second studio album by American hip hop producer Mustard. It was released on September 16, 2016, by Pu$haz Ink, Roc Nation and Republic Records. The majority of the album was produced entirely by DJ Mustard himself, and features guest appearances from YG, Ty Dolla Sign, Nipsey Hussle, RJ, Quavo, O.T. Genasis, Jeezy, Rich The Kid, TeeCee4800, K Camp, Nicki Minaj, Jeremih, Young Thug, Meek Mill, Ella Mai, Rick Ross, John Legend and James Fauntleroy.

Singles
The album's lead single, called "Don't Hurt Me" was released on July 1, 2016. The song features guest appearances from Nicki Minaj and Jeremih, with the production that was provided by DJ Mustard and Twice as Nice.

"Want Her" was released on February 28, 2017, as the album's second single. The song features guest appearances from YG and Quavo.

Track listing

Charts

References

External links

2016 albums
Albums produced by DJ Mustard
Mustard (record producer) albums
West Coast hip hop albums
Roc Nation albums
Republic Records albums